Panagiotis G. Ipeirotis (born 1976 in Serres, Greece) is a professor and George A. Kellner Faculty Fellow at the Department of Technology, Operations, and Statistics at Leonard N. Stern School of Business of New York University.

He is known for his work on crowdsourcing (especially Amazon Mechanical Turk) and on integrating human and machine intelligence.

He also worked on the intersection of data mining with economics, through the EconoMining project. The finding that good spelling and grammar can lead to improved product sales was discussed in the media.

He is the author of the blog "A Computer Scientist in a Business School", where he often writes about crowdsourcing and other topics. Many of his blog posts are frequently cited in the press and in academic papers.

Career
In 2004, Panos Ipeirotis was awarded a Ph.D. in Computer Science from Columbia University. In the same year, he joined New York University Stern School of Business where he is currently a professor and George A. Kellner Faculty Fellow at the Department of Information, Operations, and Management Sciences. He also worked for oDesk (now UpWork) as Academic-in-Residence, and at Google as a visiting scientist.

Awards
Ipeirotis is the recipient of the 2015 Lagrange Prize in Complex systems for his contributions in the field of Social media, User-generated content, and Crowdsourcing. Additionally, he has received nine "Best Paper" awards and nominations and a CAREER award from the National Science Foundation.

References 

1976 births
Living people
Columbia University alumni
Greek emigrants to the United States
New York University faculty
American computer scientists